KCF or kcf may refer to:

 Khalistan Commando Force, a militant Khalistani organisation
 Kinross Correctional Facility, a Michigan prison for men
 Korea Cycling Federation, the national governing body of cycle racing in South Korea
 KCF, the station code for Kalchini railway station, West Bengal, India
 kcf, the ISO 639-3 code for Ukaan language, Nigeria